Aydın Bayramov (born 18 February 1996) is an Azerbaijani professional footballer who plays as a goalkeeper for Sumgayit in the Azerbaijan Premier League.

Career

Club
On 8 December 2019, Bayramov made his debut in the Azerbaijan Premier League for Sumgayit match against Neftçi Baku.

References

External links
 

1996 births
Living people
Association football goalkeepers
Azerbaijani footballers
Azerbaijan Premier League players
Sumgayit FK players